Operation Duryodhana is a 2007 Telugu political thriller film, loosely inspired by the 2005 sting operation of the same name.  The movie was written and directed by Posani Krishna Murali starring Srikanth in lead role. Srikanth earned a nomination for Filmfare Best Actor – Telugu for his portrayal in the movie. The film was remade in Tamil as Thee. It was also dubbed into Hindi as Operation Dhuryodhana.

Plot
Mahesh (Srikanth) is a sincere and honest police officer. He loses his kids and his wife gets paralyzed as few politicians who don't like his sincerity harm his family. Mahesh changes his appearance and name to join the gang of politicians to become one. The rest of the story is about how he makes people realize that there is some fault in the system.

Cast
 Srikanth as Mahesh I.P.S [Circle Inspector] alias Politician Bagavanthudu
 Krishna Bhagavan
 Brahmanandam
 Chalapathi Rao as Party President
 Kalyani as Mahesh's Wife
 Mumaith Khan as Party Secretary
 Nagendra Babu as Sincere Cop
 Paruchuri Gopala Krishna as master
 Venu Madhav
 Narra Venkateswara Rao
 Motkupalli Narasimhulu in a guest role
 Dharmavarapu Subramanyam
 ETV Prabhakar as Traffic constable 
 Gehana Vasisth in a dance number
 Aparna
 M.S. Narayana
 Babusingh, Harsha, JD, Ganpati venu (villain)

Soundtrack 

"Rao Gari Annayya", Music:M.M. Srilekha
"Ek Baar Dekho", Music:M.M. Srilekha

Reception
The film was well received by both critics and the audience. Dialogues and most particularly the satires about promises made by political leaders became very famous. Srikanth was well appreciated for his rough and angry young man look. The unrelated sequel to this movie Operation Duryodhana 2 is released in 2013 under the direction of Nandam Harischandra Rao with Jagapathi Babu in lead role.

References

External links
 

2000s Telugu-language films
2000s masala films
Indian political satire films
Indian films about revenge
Telugu films remade in other languages
Indian political thriller films
Films about police brutality
Films about police corruption
Films scored by M. M. Srilekha